Khobriz Rural District is a rural district (dehestan) in the Central District of Arsanjan County, Fars Province, Iran. At the 2006 census, its population was 6,338, in 1,479 families.  The rural district has 23 villages.

References 

Rural Districts of Fars Province
Arsanjan County